Kamli (lit: Mad) is a 2022 Pakistani drama film directed by Sarmad Khoosat, who also has produced it with Kanwal Khoosat under the banner Khoosat Films. It stars Saba Qamar, Sania Saeed, Nimra Bucha and debutant Hamza Khawaja in lead roles. The film released theatrically on 3 June 2022 and opened to positive reviews from critics.

Plot 
Kamli revolves around the intertwining stories of three women and their restrained desires.

Cast

Lead
 Saba Qamar as Hina
 Hamza Khawaja as Amaltas
 Sania Saeed as Sakina
 Nimra Bucha as Zeenat

Recurring
 Omair Rana as Nadir Malik
 Iman Shahid as Noori
 Adeel Afzal as Usman
 Mehar Bano

Production 

In September 2019, Saba Qamar signed up for Sarmad Khoosat's second feature film Kamli. Besides Qamar, Sania Saeed and Nimra Bucha were also cast in this film; it was their second feature film collaboration with Khoosat after his directorial debut Manto (2015). Debutant Hamza Khawaja was selected to portray the male lead opposite Qamar. The principal photography began in the first week of October and lasted for two months. Khoosat revealed that the film would be a tragic love story.

Soundtrack 
The music of the film is composed and produced by Saad Sultan. Lyrics are written by Shakeel Sohail, Bulleh Shah, Izzat Majeed, Anjum Qureshi and Sohail Shahzad. Kamli’s music tells a story of its own. It also pays homage to Reshma jee with Maina Tu, bringing back her melodious voice at a turning point in the film.

Release
Initially planned to release on Eid-ul-Fitr 2020, the theatrical release of the film was postponed due to COVID-19 pandemic. The film was released on 3 June 2022.

International Screening
The film was screened at Indus Valley International Film Festival (IVIFF) 2022 in Chandigarh where Saba Qamar won best actress award for her performance. It was also screened at the  International Film Festival Rotterdam (IFFR) from 31 January to 2 February 2023.

Home media
The film had a Television Premier on 7 January 2023 on Hum TV.

Reception

Critical Reception
The film was lauded by critics and analysts across Pakistan. Something Haute's Manal Khan wrote, "Kamli is an important achievement, for everyone." The film also received rave review from Galaxy Lollywood's Momin Ali Munshi. Appreciating Saba Qamar's work, he added, "Yet again, Saba Qamar proves why she is Saba Qamar." The Express Tribune's Simran Siraj wrote that the film would remind you of "the mirrored wall between your reality and desires."

Accolades

See also 
 List of Pakistani films of 2022

References

External links

2022 films
2020s Urdu-language films
Pakistani drama films
Urdu-language Pakistani films